Robert Kenneth Christy (November 23, 1894 – July 23, 1962) was an American television, film, and radio character actor.

Early life
Born Robert Kenneth Christy, he was the second of three children of Alice Christy and Olivier B. Christy. He was born in Greenville, Pennsylvania. According to census records, Christy served in World War I.

Career

Radio 
The actor started his career on radio programs. From the early 1930s, he had a nearly three decade career on radio, with roles in such popular radio series as  Little Orphan Annie, where he played Mr. Bonds, The Great Gildersleeve on which he was a regular as the chief of police, as well as portraying several dramatic roles on Suspense. A versatile artist, he was equally comfortable in serious minded programs, such as The Fifth Horseman, Gangbusters, Jack Armstrong, the All-American Boy, and The Saint as he was with comedy series like Amos 'n' Andy, A Day in the Life of Dennis Day, and The Alan Young Show. In the 1940s, he portrayed Inspector Danton on Mystery Is My Hobby.

Film and television
Christy appeared in 144 films and television programs between 1940 and 1962 and many of his films list him as uncredited. His first acting role was in the film Foreign Correspondent (1940) and his career ended with the television series Shannon (1962).

A 1950 newspaper article cited the predominance of police roles in Christy's film background, saying, "in 98 out of 100 film roles he has played an officer of the law." Christy said,"I'd give anything to stop making arrests and be the guy who commits the crime for once."

Christy's film credits include Burma Convoy (1941),Sunset Blvd as the homicide detective trying to question Norma Desmond,  Tarzan's New York Adventure (1942), Cheaper by the Dozen (1950), A Place in the Sun (1951), Abbott and Costello Go to Mars (1953), Inside Detroit (1956), and Utah Blaine (1957).

His television credits include Gang Busters (1952), Meet Corliss Archer (1954), Death Valley Days (1955), I Love Lucy (1954–56), Celebrity Playhouse (1956), Dragnet (1957), and Wagon Train (1958), General Electric Theater (1959), M Squad (1960), My Three Sons (1961) and Bat Masterson (1961).

Death
Christy died in Hollywood at the age of 67. His remains are interred at Valhalla Memorial Park Cemetery in North Hollywood.

Selected filmography

References

External links

1894 births
1962 deaths
Male actors from Pennsylvania
American male film actors
American male radio actors
American military personnel of World War I
American male television actors
People from Greenville, Pennsylvania
20th-century American male actors